Francine Hirsch is an American historian, specializing in modern Europe with a focus on Russia and the Soviet Union. She is a recipient of the Herbert Baxter Adams Prize for her book, Empire of Nations: Ethnographic Knowledge and the Making of the Soviet Union, as well as honors from the American Society of International Law, the Council of European Studies, and the Association for Slavic, East European, and Eurasian Studies for her work.

Education and career 
Hirsch has a B.A. from Cornell University, and completed her M.A. and Ph.D. from Princeton University. She is currently a professor of History at University of Wisconsin-Madison.

Research and publications 
Hirsch's first book, Empire of Nations: Ethnographic Knowledge and the Making of the Soviet Union (Cornell University Press, 2005) won the  Herbert Baxter Adams Prize, awarded by the American Historical Association,  in 2007. Empire of Nations also won the Wayne S. Vucinich Book Prize, sponsored by the Association for Slavic, East European, and Eurasian Studies (ASEEES) and Stanford University, in 2006, and the Council for European Studies Book Award, in 2006.

Her second book, Soviet Judgment at Nuremberg: A New History of the International Military Tribunal After World War II (New York: Oxford University Press, 2020) is a history of the Nuremberg Trials, and won a Certificate of Merit from the American Society of International Law for "a preeminent contribution to creative scholarship" in 2021.

References 

21st-century American women writers
American women historians
Princeton University alumni
Cornell University alumni
Year of birth missing (living people)
Living people
Place of birth missing (living people)
University of Wisconsin–Madison faculty
21st-century American historians
Historians of Russia
Historians of the Soviet Union